Red Diapers: Growing Up in the Communist Left is the first anthology of autobiographical writings by "Red Diaper Babies" — children of communist or other radical-left parents. Edited by Judy Kaplan and Linn Shapiro, it consists of memoirs, short stories, and poems. Among the 40 authors are such well known figures as journalist Carl Bernstein, feminist writer Kim Chernin, scientist Richard Levins, and author/activist Robert Meeropol (son of Julius and Ethel Rosenberg).

The book has been widely praised by some of the major figures of 20th century radical politics, reviewed in radical and academic periodicals, and used as a textbook in radical history courses at Pennsylvania State University and East Stroudsberg University, as well as being reviewed by the mainstream media.

Reviews
Bettina Aptheker Humbooks, U.C. Santa Cruz:  "extraordinary multi-author account of how it felt and what it meant to grow up Communist in twentieth-century America"
Angela Davis: "A remarkable collective memoir.... It bears witness to a powerful tradition of radical 'family values' from which emerged a generation of leftist organizers who have made an indelible mark on U.S. social movements. Perhaps most importantly, this wonderful volume demystifies the process of radicalization by foregrounding the humanity of those of us whose family legacies have been defined by radicalism."
Pat Devine,  University of Manchester in  Communist History Network Newsletter: "This is a wonderful book. Through it we enter a world populated by ordinary people who did extraordinary things in exceptional circumstances as they worked to make the world a better place."
Howard Zinn: "These are fascinating glimpses of the lives of a special group of people, poignant and thought-provoking — an important contribution to the social history of our time."
Meredith Tax, Women's Review of Books,"  April, 1999: "Not only does it address historical issues central to the Left, but also questions of concern to anyone who wants to know how a political subculture can be maintained..."
Journal of American History v.87 (2), Sept. 2000.
Socialist History Journal, v.19
Society and Science v.64 (2000)
First Things: the Journal of Science Religion and Culture" (1999)
Leslie Paris,  "Journal of Women's History" v.12 (4)
Womens Review (Wellesley College)

Publishing information
 

Autobiographies
Books about communism
University of Illinois Press books